Claudio Corradino (born 25 August 1959 in Cossato) is an Italian politician.

Corradino is a member of the right-wing party Lega Nord and served as mayor of the town of Cossato from 2009 to 2019.

He ran for Mayor of Biella at the 2019 local elections and was elected at the second round on 9 June. He took office on 14 June 2019.

See also
2019 Italian local elections
List of mayors of Biella

References

External links

1959 births
Living people
Mayors of Biella
Lega Nord politicians